Martinichthys is an extinct genus of prehistoric bony fish from the Cretaceous of North America. It is known from the Niobrara Chalk, in which it is exceedingly rare.

References

Tselfatiiformes
Late Cretaceous fish
Cretaceous animals of North America